Alice Foulcher is an Australian writer and actress, best known for the Australian indie drama-comedy That's Not Me (2017). She is also known for her roles in Paris Syndrome and A Bit Rich.

Career 
Foulcher is a graduate of the Victorian College of the Arts, School of Film & TV, Melbourne, Australia. She frequently collaborates with her husband, director/writer Gregory Erdstein. Their work together includes feature film That's Not Me, the controversial short film Picking up at Auchwitz, Tropfest finalist A Bit Rich, and Paris Syndrome.

In 2014 Foulcher and Erdstein spent 8 months in an artist residency at the Cité des Arts Internationale, Paris. During this period they made the short film Paris Syndrome, and wrote the screenplay for their first feature film, That's Not Me.

As well as co-writing That's Not Me with Erdstein, Foulcher stars in the film in dual roles as identical twins Polly and Amy Cuthbert. Appearing in every scene of the film, sometimes twice, Foulcher's performance has been met with critical acclaim, and earned her a Best Actress nomination for the 2018 Australian Film Critics Association awards. The film has been met with a Rotten Tomatoes approval rating of 87%. Luke Buckmaster of The Guardian gave the film 4 out of 5 stars, writing "At the centre of That’s Not Me is a commanding performance from Foulcher, who establishes herself as a major emerging actor". Time Out also gave the film 4 out of 5 stars, with critic Nick Dent writing "Alice Foulcher deserves to be a lock for Best Actress [for the 2017 AACTA awards]. [She] conveys low self-esteem with the comedic flair of a Kristin Wiig". Louise of Urban Cinefile writes that "Foulcher is a knockout. She is unselfconscious and instantly likeable.  Sibling rivalry, celebrity and chasing dreams have never been so much fun in this energetic, uplifting character-driven comedy that soars as surely as the trajectory of its irresistible star”.  Andy Howell of Ain't It Cool writes “[Alice Foulcher] shoulders all the drama and gives one of the best twin performances I’ve ever seen... Having nuanced drama embedded in a comedy is a tightrope walk, but she’s got the skills to land it.”  Leigh Paatsch of the Herald Sun gave the film a positive review, noting "a wonderful performance by Foulcher in a deceptively demanding role". Film Alert 101 suggests that Foulcher "may well be the comic talent of her age", radio station 2ser 107.3 describes her as "absolutely superb throughout",  and with Junkee Media writing that "it really is Foulcher's show".

Filmed in Melbourne, Australia and Los Angeles, USA in 2015 and 2016, That's Not Me had its World Premiere at the 2017 Santa Barbara International Film Festival. The film had its Australian Premiere in June 2017 at the Sydney Film Festival, where it came Fourth at the Foxtel Movies Audience Awards,. It placed Ninth in the Audience Awards at the 2017 Melbourne International Film Festival. That's Not Me won the award for Best Film Under $200k at the inaugural 2018 Ozflix Independent Film Awards. It was ranked #5 of The Guardian's Top 10 Australian Films of 2017. In 2020 That's Not Me was nominated for the AACTA Byron Kennedy Award, as one of the top 12 indie feature films of the past decade.

Filmography

References

External links 
 

Living people
Year of birth missing (living people)